The men's 250 metres competition at the 2010 Asian Games in Guangzhou was held on 20 November 2010 at the Zengcheng Dragon Boat Lake.

Schedule
All times are China Standard Time (UTC+08:00)

Squads

Results

Heats 
 Qualification: 1 + Next best time → Grand final (GF), Rest → Repechage (R)

Heat 1

Heat 2

Repechages 
 Qualification: 1 + Next best time → Grand final (GF), Rest → Minnor final (MF)

Heat 1

Heat 2

Finals

Minor final

Grand final

References 

Official Website

External links 
International Dragon Boat Federation

Dragon boat at the 2010 Asian Games